Ariel Texido (born March 19, 1981, La Habana, Cuba); is a Cuban actor.

Filmography

Awards and nominations

References

External links 

Cuban male telenovela actors
Cuban male film actors
1981 births
Living people
People from La Habana Province
21st-century Cuban male actors